Casa Peralta is a historic home located at 384 W. Estudillo Ave. in San Leandro, California. The home was built in 1901 by Ludovino Peralta and originally had a Colonial Revival design. The original design included Tuscan columns, modillions, and a dentillated cornice, features which remain a part of the home. After Ludovino died, the home passed to her sister Maria and later to her niece Hermania Peralta Dargie. In 1927, Hermania hired Captain Antonio Martin to redesign the house in the style of the Peralta family's estate in Spain. Martin's design added a formal garden with a fountain, a front porch with tiles depicting scenes from Don Quixote, and a four-story tower.

The house was added to the National Register of Historic Places on January 4, 1982. It is now a historic museum run by the City of San Leandro.

References

External links
 Casa Peralta - official site

Houses on the National Register of Historic Places in California
Colonial Revival architecture in California
Mission Revival architecture in California
Museums in Alameda County, California
Houses completed in 1901
National Register of Historic Places in Alameda County, California
Houses in Alameda County, California
Historic house museums in California
1901 establishments in California